Marek Andrzej Piwowski (born 24 October 1935 in Warsaw) is a Polish film director and screenwriter. He is best known for his cult film Rejs (1970).

Filmography
 Rejs – 1970
 Psychodrama – 1972
 Korkociąg (pl) – 1972
 Przepraszam, czy tu biją? (pl) – 1976
 Uprowadzenie Agaty (pl) – 1993
 Oskar (pl) – 2005

Awards
 1976 – Przepraszam, czy tu biją? FPFF – Jury Main Award
 1976 – Przepraszam, czy tu biją? FPFF – Publicity Award
 1977 – Przepraszam, czy tu biją? Złota Kamera (Gold Camera) (magazine "Film") in category: best movie
 1997 – Krok Przegląd "Felliniada" – Wielki Fe Fe – for doing his job in movies
 1998 – Krok International Short Movies Festival – Brązowy Smok (Golden Dragon)
 2001 – Krzyż Komandorski Orderu Odrodzenia Polski (Polish Comoddore Cross)

External links
 Interview at "Newsweek" 
Marek Piwowski at Culture.pl

Polish film directors
1935 births
Living people
Łódź Film School alumni